Mount Huggins is a large conical mountain,  high, surmounting the heads of Allison Glacier, Dale Glacier, and Potter Glacier in the Royal Society Range of Antarctica. It was discovered by the British National Antarctic Expedition (1901–04) which named it for Sir William Huggins, President of the Royal Society, 1900–05. The mountain was first ascended by the explorer Richard Brooke in 1957. Auster Pass is a high pass between Mount Huggins and Mount Kempe.

References

Mountains of Victoria Land
Scott Coast